For the 1960s UK TV series, see United!.

United was a 1990 television documentary series first screened in the United Kingdom on BBC Two in 1990. The series followed the fortunes of English football team Sheffield United during the 1989–90 football season.

Themes and format
Consisting of six half-hour episodes, the series followed Sheffield United as they chased promotion from Division Two, with the final episode focusing on the final games of the season as they achieved this ambition. Each of the episodes concerned one element of United the cameras were given full behind-the-scenes access to the club's inner workings.

Each episode focused on a specific element of the club:
 
The Players
The Wives
The Board
The Fans
The Apprentices
The Managers

Transmission
Debuting on 6 April 1990, the series was first shown on BBC Two with each episode airing at 9pm on successive Fridays.

References

External links
Shoot Magazine article on the filming of the series

1990 British television series debuts
1990 British television series endings
1990s British documentary television series
BBC television documentaries
Documentary films about association football
Sheffield United F.C.
British sports documentary films